Hélène Gordon-Lazareff (21 September 1909 – 16 February 1988) was a French journalist of Russian Jewish origin who founded Elle magazine in 1945. She was married to Pierre Lazareff, founder of the newspaper France-Soir. She had two daughters, Michèle Lazareff-Rosier from her first marriage and Nina Lazareff from her second marriage with Pierre.

Life
Born in Russia, Hélène Gordon-Lazareff fled to France from the Bolshevik Revolution. She studied ethnography at the Sorbonne. She began her career as a journalist in the 1930s, writing the children's page for France-Soir under the name "Tante Juliette". She later married the owner of the newspaper, Pierre Lazareff in 1938. The couple left Paris for New York after the outbreak of World War II. Gordon-Lazareff was easily integrated into journalist circles in New York because of her perfect English. She became an editor of the women's page of the New York Times after working for Harper's Bazaar and. She returned to Paris in 1944 a couple of weeks after the city was liberated. She decided to start her own fashion magazine and used the experience she had after having worked for several American magazines. A year later the first issue of Elle magazine was published in October "on paper so course that it reminded her of French bread".  After a year journalist Françoise Giroud was hired to take over as editor-in-chief of the magazine when Gordon-Lazareff became seriously ill. In Profession Journaliste Françoise Giroud describes Gordon-Lazareff as "a brilliant, young woman".

References

Sources
Hélène Gordon at Enfant Terribles, Susan Weiner, published in 2001
Elle's history at Elle
Not So Chichi, Time Magazine U.S.
Hélène Gordon at Profession Journaliste, Françoise Giroud
Hélène Gordon Lazareff: The Tsarina Who Was ELLE, Véronique Vienne

1909 births
1988 deaths
French people of Russian-Jewish descent
White Russian emigrants to France
Harper's Bazaar
The New York Times people
Burials at Père Lachaise Cemetery
20th-century American writers
Elle (magazine) writers
Emigrants from the Russian Empire to France
Women's page journalists
20th-century French journalists